Smith Township, Indiana may refer to one of the following places:

Smith Township, Greene County, Indiana
Smith Township, Posey County, Indiana
Smith Township, Whitley County, Indiana

See also

Smith Township (disambiguation)

Indiana township disambiguation pages